Anuradha T.K. is a retired Indian scientist and project director of the Indian Space Research Organisation (ISRO), specialized communication satellites. She has worked on the launches of the satellites GSAT-12 and GSAT-10. She is the senior most female scientist at ISRO, having joined the space agency in 1982, and also the first woman to become a satellite project director at ISRO.

Personal Background

  Anuradha TK was born in Bangalore, Mysore State (now Karnataka) in 1961. She graduated with a bachelor's degree in electronics from the University Visvesvaraya College of Engineering in Bangalore. Because she was interested in science and always wanted to join the space program, she rejected an offer from India Institute of Science (IISc) to study Master of Science.. She graduated with a bachelor's degree in electronics from the University Visvesvaraya College of Engineering in Bangalore. Anuradha has three sisters. Her father was a professor of Sanskrit, and her mother was a homemaker. When Neil Armstrong landed on the moon in 1969, she was only in primary school. Her parents inspired her a lot. They always told her a lot about the moon mission. And encouraged her and her sister to go ahead and compete in any field they wanted. So, two of her sisters became electrical engineers and the other became a doctor.
 
Also, Anuradha married into a family in which everyone is fascinated by electronics. Her husband is the general manager at Bharat Electronics. Her eldest daughter is a computer science engineer in the US, and her second daughter is a student of electronic engineering. “My husband and parents-in-law were always cooperative, so I didn’t have to worry much about my children,” she says. 
.

Career 

Unlike many of her classmates, she chose to stay in India to pursue her career. The first job was testing satellites at the Satellite Centre in Bangalore, and her boss was Prof U. R. Rao, who later served as the chairman of the agency from 1984 to 1994. Anuradha developed electronic equipment for satellites.
 Anuradha TK is the senior-most woman officer who has worked in Indian Space Research Organization (ISRO) for 34 years. Anuradha is the role model at work. She always said “You don’t get any special treatment because you’re a woman, you’re also not discriminated against because you’re a woman. You’re treated as an equal here."
She said “I never liked subjects where I needed to remember a lot and science looked logical to me. I don’t believe that Indian girls think science is not meant for them and I think math is their favorite subject." Her satellite project director has given her so many supports, unlike others who think that women and science don’t gel. She has been a leading figure in several Indian space programs.

Anuradha innovation is that she create a unique way to control the geo-synchronous satellites. Anuradha successfully maneuvered GSAT- 12 into its final orbit through complex operations executed from the control facility in Hassan. It was her Innovate that made GSAT-12 a success. Her method continues to be used today. For the first time, an all women team did the job at Hassan. And so, the space agency has now lined up many more tasks for them. As the project director, she also oversaw the launch of the GSAT-9, GSAT-17 and GSAT-18 communication satellites. She has also served as Project Manager, Deputy Project Director and Associate Project Director for the Indian Remote Sensing and the Indian Regional Navigation Satellite System programs. Her specialty is satellite checkout systems which observe a satellite's performance once it is in space.
 
" Her advice to women aspiring to be rocket scientists is simple: make arrangements.” "Once girls see that there are lots of women in the space program, they also get motivated, they think if she can do it, so can they.” Anuradha’s growth and story inspire many people today. With her encouragement, more and more women chose to join scientific careers
. She supervised and headed the technical group of 20 engineers. As a part of an all-women research team, together with Pramoda Hedge and Anuradha Prakash, she maneuvered the GSAT-12 into its final orbit from ISRO's Master Control Facility (MCF) in Hassan.

After working with the GSAT-12, Anuradha TK led the launch of the much bigger communication satellite GSAT-10 in September 2012.

As the project director, she also oversaw the launch of the GSAT-9, GSAT-17 and GSAT-18 communication satellites. She has also served as Project Manager, Deputy Project Director and Associate Project Director for the Indian Remote Sensing and the Indian Regional Navigation Satellite System programs. Her specialty is satellite checkout systems which observe a satellite's performance once it is in space.

Awards 
 2003 Space Gold Medal award by Astronautical Society of India for the services in the field of Space sciences
 2011 Suman Sharma Award by National Design & Research Forum National Design and Research Forum (NDRF) of IEI
 2012 ASI- ISRO Merit Award for Realization of Indigenous Communication spacecraft
 2012 ISRO Team Award 2012 for being team leader for the realization of GSAT-12

References

Women scientists from Karnataka
1961 births
Indian Space Research Organisation people
Scientists from Bangalore
Living people
20th-century Indian women scientists
20th-century Indian engineers
21st-century Indian engineers
21st-century Indian women scientists
Engineers from Karnataka
Indian women engineers
University Visvesvaraya College of Engineering alumni
20th-century women engineers
21st-century women engineers